Center for Biochemical technology (CBT) is the old name for the Institute of Genomics and Integrative Biology. The research institute under the purview of CSIR, INDIA was named IGIB in 2002 depicting a shift towards integrated biological research with genomics and bioinformatics approaches along with the pre-existing biochemical and bio-molecular research approaches.

References

Scientific organisations based in India
Council of Scientific and Industrial Research
Biological research institutes
Research institutes in Delhi